Pinotti is an Italian surname. Notable people with the surname include:

Henrique Walter Pinotti, Brazilian physician, surgeon, professor of surgery at the University of São Paulo's Medical School
José Aristodemo Pinotti (born 1934), Brazilian physician, gynecological surgeon, university professor, educational leader and politician
Marco Pinotti (born 1976), Italian road racing cyclist for UCI ProTeam Team Columbia
Mario Pinotti (1894–1972), Brazilian medic and sanitarist
Roberta Pinotti (born 1961), Italian politician

See also
12470 Pinotti, main-belt asteroid
Plasmodium pinotti, parasite of the genus Plasmodium subgenus Giovannolaia

Italian-language surnames